The 2021 Houston Baptist Huskies football team represented Houston Baptist University—now known as Houston Christian University—as a member of the Southland Conference during the 2021 NCAA Division I FCS football season. Led by ninth-year head coach Vic Shealy the Huskies compiled an overall record of 0–11 with a mark of 0–8 in conference play, placing last out of six teams teams in the Southland. Houston Baptist played home games at Husky Stadium in Houston.

Previous season

The Huskies finished the 2020 season with a 1–3 record during the shortened season due to the COVID-19 pandemic. Houston Baptist, along with now-former Southland members Abilene Christian, Central Arkansas, and Stephen F. Austin, decided to opt out of the scheduled FCS 2021 spring season and instead played against FBS teams and other FCS teams who opted out of the spring during the 2020 fall season, playing North Texas, Texas Tech, Louisiana Tech, and Eastern Kentucky. Because of this, the Huskies did not qualify to play in any postseason tournament play.

Preseason

Preseason poll
The Southland Conference released their preseason poll in July 2021. The Huskies were picked to finish sixth in the conference. In addition, six Huskies were chosen to the Preseason All-Southland Team.

Preseason All–Southland Teams

Offense

1st Team
Christian Hood – Offensive Lineman, SO

2nd Team
Dreshawn Minnieweather – Running Back, SR

Defense

1st Team
Patrick Wolfe – Defensive Back, SR

2nd Team
Segun Ijiyera – Defensive Lineman, JR
Philip Ossai – Defensive Lineman, SO
Brennan Young – Linebacker, JR

Personnel

Schedule

Game summaries

at New Mexico

Northern Colorado

at Prairie View A&M

at Nicholls

Northwestern State

at No. 11 Southeastern Louisiana

Nicholls

at No. 22 Incarnate Word

at Northwestern State

McNeese State

No. 18 Incarnate Word

References

Houston Baptist
Houston Christian Huskies football seasons
College football winless seasons
Houston Baptist Huskies football